Chashin (also Romanized as Chashīn and Cheshīn; also known as Kāshī, Kāshin, and Keshīn) is a village in Abaru Rural District, in the Central District of Hamadan County, Hamadan Province, Iran. At the 2006 census, its population was 1,447, in 360 families.

References 

Populated places in Hamadan County